East Taunton is a suburban neighborhood of Taunton, Massachusetts, United States.

Economy
East Taunton is home to Massasoit State Park which offers mountain bike trails, and kayaking and fishing on the park's four main lakes, the largest of which is Lake Rico. Other lakes in the park include Big Bear Hole Pond, Middle Pond, and Little Bear Hole Pond. It is also the location of some of the oldest active manufacturers in the US, including Norwell Manufacturing, a maker of lighting products for over 75 years. The neighborhood is served by East Taunton police precinct and the East Taunton Fire station.

Transportation
East Taunton is serviced by Route 140, and is minutes from Route 24. It also minutes from the Middleboro/Lakeville commuter rail line which provides service to Boston. Route 79 also runs north–south through East Taunton between Berkley and Middleboro, and serves as the town line for Taunton and Lakeville.

See also
Beer Can Museum - located in East Taunton

Neighborhoods in Massachusetts
Populated places in Bristol County, Massachusetts
Taunton, Massachusetts